Commando Regiment may refer to:
Commando Battalion  (Albania), Albanian Land Forces, Albania
Parachute Commando Regiments, Algeria
1st Commando Regiment (Australia), Australia
2nd Commando Regiment (Australia)
Immediate Reaction Cell, formally known as the Para-Commando Regiment, Belgium
Marine Commando Regiment, proposed unit, Canada
Lebanese Commando Regiment, Lebanon
21st and 22nd Commando Regiments of the Gurp Gerak Khas, Malaysia
1st Special Commando Regiment, Poland
Commando Regiment, Portugal
Sri Lanka Army Commando Regiment, Sri Lanka
29th Commando Regiment Royal Artillery, United Kingdom

See also
 Commando